1992 Yokohama Flügels season

Team name
Club nameANA Satokogyo Football Club
NicknameA.S Flügels

Review and events

Competitions

Domestic results

Emperor's Cup

J.League Cup

Player statistics

Transfers

In:

Out:

Transfers during the season

In
none

Out
none

References

Other pages
 J. League official site
 Yokohama F. Marinos official web site

Yokohama Flugels
Yokohama Flügels seasons